The Reynosa Broncos (los Broncos de Reynosa) were a Mexican team that played in the Adolfo Lopez Mateos stadium in the city of Reynosa, Tamaulipas.

The Broncos de Reynosa played in the Liga Mexicana de Beisbol and it was part of the Zona Norte division.

The Broncos returned to Reynosa's Stadium Adolfo Lopez Mateos in March 2009 through the efforts of Mayor Oscar Luebbeert. Major improvements to the stadium were made to attract fans. The stadium went into some major improvements that include converting the stadium into a big skeleton in order to renew installations, new parking section, new WC areas, new box seats. There was a change of team colors moving from the traditional orange to a new green.

Broncos de Reynosa won the Championship of The Liga Mexicana de Beisbol in 1969, defeating the Sultanes de Monterrey.

The Broncos franchise has been transferred to the Bravos de León twice, in 1982 and 2016.

References

External links
Broncos de Reynosa Official Website (Spanish)

Defunct Mexican League teams
Reynosa
Baseball teams established in 1963
Baseball teams disestablished in 2016
Defunct baseball teams in Mexico